L’Age D’Or was a German independent music label based in Hamburg, which has played an important role in creating the Hamburger Schule and was the parent label of Ladomat 2000.

The label was founded in 1988 by Carol von Rautenkranz and Kolossale Jugend guitarist Pascal Fuhlbrügge, who together had already been organizing concerts in the post-NDW music scene of Hamburg for some time. They were joined by Thorsten "Taucher" Weßel from the band Ostzonensuppenwürfelmachenkrebs, who later became a co-owner. Fuhlbrügge left the label in 1993. In 1994 Ladomat 2000 was launched by Charlotte Goltermann as a sublabel to also release electronic music. Both labels went out of business in 2007.

The releases on L'Age D'Or were formative for the Hamburger Schule. Ladomat 2000 reflected this scene's growing interest in rave, techno and house music. Tocotronic, Die Sterne and the house music project Whirlpool Productions reached some commercial success in the mid-nineties.

L'Age D'Or artists

Ladomat 2000 artists

Sources 
 lado.de - official website
 L'Age D'Or and Ladomat 2000 on Discogs

German record labels